The National Institutes of Health, Islamabad (NIH), is a Pakistani research institute located in Islamabad, Pakistan. 

The institute is an autonomous body of Ministry of National Health Services, Regulation and Coordination, mainly responsible for biomedical and health related research along with vaccine manufacturing.

References

External links
NIH official website
National Control Laboratory for Biologicals (NCLB) official website
Drug Regulatory Authority of Pakistan (DRAP) official website

Medical and health organisations based in Pakistan
Medical research institutes in Pakistan
Research institutes in Pakistan
Pakistan federal departments and agencies
1965 establishments in Pakistan
Government agencies established in 1965
National public health agencies